Takashi Kamiyama (born 22 March 1973) is a Japanese professional golfer.

Kamiyama played on the Japan Golf Tour, winning once.

Professional wins (1)

Japan Golf Tour wins (1)

Japan Golf Tour playoff record (1–0)

Results in major championships

Note: Kamiyama only played in The Open Championship.
"T" = tied

Team appearances
Dynasty Cup (representing Japan): 2005

External links

Japanese male golfers
Japan Golf Tour golfers
Sportspeople from Tokyo
1973 births
Living people